Rice stripe tenuivirus is an RNA plant pathogen of the genus Tenuivirus. It is prevalent in Japan, China, and Korea and can infect plants of the family Poaceae, which include wheat and corn (see maize stripe virus). Damage from this disease causes major reductions in rice crop yield every year.

It is spread primarily by Laodelphax striatellus, a small planthopper that feeds and damages rice plants by sap-sucking. Three other planthopper insects that transmit rice stripe virus include Unkanodes sapporona, Unkanodoes albifascia, and Terthron albovittatum. The virus propagates in the planthopper and is passed down to 90% of a female's eggs. However, mechanically transmitting the virus by injecting sap from an affected plant to a healthy plant has not been widely successful.

Symptoms
Rice plants are susceptible to infection starting at the seedling age. The only known means of virus transmission is via planthoppers. Typical symptoms of rice stripe virus infection include pale and discontinuous yellow stripes, blotches, and dead tissue streaks on the leaves. Severe infections cause grey necrotic streaks and result in the death of the plant.

Young plants
Infection causes the most damage during seedling stage to maximum tillering stage because during this time interval, the plants are at a higher risk of death. Affected seedlings are stunted in growth with leaves that elongate without unfolding. Their color pales to white with drooped, curled, dead leaves. In Japan, this disease was called "Yurei Byo" (ghost disease) because of these symptoms. If the plants grow, they produce few, if any, tillers and panicles with empty spikelets.

Mature plants
Infected mature plants do not have severe chlorosis or blotches, but ripening may be hindered. They can still produce rice, but with less vigor.

Structure
The virus is made up of four ssRNA segments, seven open reading frames, a nucleocapsid protein, and an RNA polymerase protein. It is 8 nm in diameter and 500-2000 nm long.
RNA 1: This is the largest ssRNA segment with 8970 nucleotides. RNA 1 is negative sense and encodes a protein that is part of the RNA polymerase.
RNA 2 and RNA 4: These strands are ambisense.
RNA 3: Encodes for gene silencing suppressor proteins and nucleocapsid proteins.

Epidemics
This table from KnowledgeBank.irri.org summarizes reported epidemics of rice stripe virus.

Prevention
The lowland rice plants in Japan (japonica-type) are easily afflicted by rice stripe virus: however, upland japonica-type, indica-type, and Javanese varieties are resistant genetically. Hybrid varieties Chugoku 31 and St No1 were bred in Japan by crossing japonica-type cv. Norin No 8 with indica-type Modan. The offspring of this cross was then crossed with cv. Norin 8. Chugoku 31 and St No1 have been used to breed different varieties of rice stripe virus resistant rice plants in Japan.

Since the 1950s, Japanese rice farmers have adopted the practice of planting rice early in the season. This allows the plants to grow past the tillering stage by the time planthoppers immigrate from wheat and barley plants.

References

Bibliography

Tenuiviruses
Viral plant pathogens and diseases